Zbigniew Janiszewski (born 16 August 1931) is a Polish athlete. He competed in the men's pole vault at the 1956 Summer Olympics.

References

1931 births
Living people
Athletes (track and field) at the 1956 Summer Olympics
Polish male pole vaulters
Olympic athletes of Poland
Place of birth missing (living people)